Tremezzo is a comune (or municipality) of some 1,300 people in the Province of Como, in the Italian region Lombardy.

As well as the capoluogo of Tremezzo, the area of the commune includes the frazione Rogaro, birthplace of the architect Pietro Lingeri.

Tremezzo is best known as a tourist resort—it was a favourite of Konrad Adenauer—and for its villas, of which the most famous is the Villa Carlotta with its much-admired gardens, and Villa Sola-Busca.

The Comune di Tremezzo will be united to Mezzegra, Ossuccio and Lenno to form a single municipality named Tremezzina: the new administration will be formalized after election of the Major on 25 May 2014

Demographic evolution

References

External links
 Official website

Cities and towns in Lombardy
Tremezzina